The Bahengic (Pahungic) languages are a divergent branch of the Miao (Hmongic) languages. Speakers are among the ethnic Bunu: Miao-speaking Yao people of China.

Pa-Hng (Baheng) has long been recognized as a divergent language. Benedict (1986) argued that one of its dialects constituted a separate branch of the Miao–Yao family, and Ratliff (2010) found it to be the most divergent Hmongic language that she analyzed. Mao & Li (1997) determined that two poorly known languages are closely related to Pa-Hng, though none are mutually intelligible:

Bahengic
Hm-Nai (Wunai)
Pa-Hng (Baheng)

Younuo (Yuno) was classified as a sister of Bahengic by Mao & Li (1997), although Younuo was later classified as Sheic.

References

Hmongic languages
Languages of China
Languages of Thailand